Barium metaphosphate is an inorganic substance with the molecular formula Ba(PO3)2.  It is a colourless solid that is insoluble in  water, though is soluble in acidic solutions through "slow dissolution".  X-ray crystallography shows that this material is composed of Ba2+ cations attached to a polyphosphate ((PO3−)n) anion. A number of hydrated forms are known which are actually cyclic metaphosphates, Ba2(P4O12)·3.5H2O, Ba3(P3O9)2·6H2O.

Preparation
Barium metaphosphate can be prepared by the reaction of barium carbonate with metaphosphoric acid:-
BaCO3 + 2HPO3 → Ba(PO3)2 +CO2 +H2O
or alternatively by the aqueous reaction of barium chloride and sodium metaphosphate:-
BaCl2(aq) + 2NaPO3(aq) → Ba(PO3)2 + 2NaCl

Applications
The combination of sodium and barium polyphosphate forms a low-melting glass with a high coefficient of thermal expansion. The melting point of the glass increases with barium content. This glass makes seals with low melting metals like aluminium (melting point 650 °C).  Normal borosilicate glasses soften above the melting point of aluminium. This mixture is prepared by heating a mixture of diammonium phosphate, sodium carbonate, and barium carbonate.

References 

Barium compounds
Metaphosphates